General elections were held in India between 24 February and 9 June 1957, the second elections to the Lok Sabha after independence. They were held five years after the 1951–52 elections in accordance with the provisions of the Constitution of India. Elections to many state legislatures were held simultaneously.

There were 494 seats elected using first past the post voting system. Out of the 403 constituencies, 91 elected two members, while the remaining 312 elected a single member. The multi-seat constituencies were abolished before the next election.

Under the leadership of Jawaharlal Nehru, the Indian National Congress easily won a second term in power, taking 371 of the 494 seats. They gained an extra seven seats (the size of the Lok Sabha had been increased by five) and their vote share increased from 45.0% to 47.8%. The INC won nearly five times more votes than the Communist Party, the second largest party. In addition, 19.3% of the vote and 42 seats went to independent candidates, the highest of any Indian general election.

Results

Results by state

Voting
The first instance of booth capturing in India was recorded in 1957 in the General Elections of that year in Rachiyahi, in Begusarai's Matihani assembly seat.

See also 
Election Commission of India
Booth capturing
1957 Indian presidential election

References

General election
February 1957 events in Asia
March 1957 events in Asia
India
General elections in India